William H. Tooker (September 2, 1869 – October 10, 1936) was an American stage and film actor. 

Tooker acted with the Tivoli Comic Opera Company in San Francisco. On Broadway, he performed in The Coronet of the Duchess (1904) and The Governor's Lady (1912). His film debut was in The Stealers.

In addition to acting, Tooker was a chemist who invented polish for tan shoes.

He was born in New York and died in Hollywood California.

Selected filmography
How Molly Made Good (1915)
 The Curious Conduct of Judge Legarde (1915)
 Sunday (1915)
 A Modern Magdalen (1915) as Joe Mercer
 A Fool's Revenge (1916)
 A Modern Thelma (1916)
East Lynne (1916)
Ambition (1916)
 Red, White and Blue Blood (1917)
 The Bitter Truth (1917)
 The Light in Darkness (1917)
Men (1918)
The Woman the Germans Shot (1918)
The Lost Battalion (1919)
Greater Than Fame (1920)
Heliotrope (1920)
 The Vice of Fools (1920)
 The Greatest Love (1920)
Proxies (1921)
 The Power Within (1921)
 Worlds Apart (1921)
God's Country and the Law (1921)
Peacock Alley (1922)
Beyond the Rainbow (1922)
 The Cradle Buster (1922)
My Friend the Devil (1922)
 Sinner or Saint (1923)
 The Purple Highway (1923) 
 Wife in Name Only (1923)
The Average Woman (1924)
 Who's Cheating? (1924)
The Lone Wolf (1924)
 The Phantom Express (1925)
The Scarlet Letter (1926)
The White Black Sheep (1926)
 The Merry Cavalier (1926)
Two Girls Wanted (1927)
The Devil Dancer (1927)
 Jake the Plumber (1927)
 Birds of Prey (1927)
A Woman Against the World (1928)
 Virgin Lips (1928)
 Sweet Sixteen (1928)
Night Watch (1928)
Romance of the Underworld (1928)
The Bellamy Trial (1929)
No Defense (1929)

References

External links

William H. Tooker(Kinotv)

1869 births
1936 deaths
Male actors from New York City
American male silent film actors
20th-century American male actors
American male film actors
American male stage actors
Broadway theatre people